Saúl Blanco González (born May 15, 1985 in Oviedo, Spain) is a professional basketball player who plays for Spanish club Liberbank Oviedo Baloncesto of the LEB Oro league.

Pro career
Blanco started his career in 2003 at LEB team Gijón Baloncesto. Two years later, he debuts in Liga ACB with Baloncesto Fuenlabrada, where his good performance allows him to sign with Euroleague squad Unicaja. In 2012, he signs for CB Canarias.

Blanco played also for the Asturias basketball team.

In 2017, after an absence of one year, Blanco returned to the professional basketball by signing for Real Betis Energía Plus of the Liga ACB. However, he rescinded his contract before the end of the season, finishing it at LEB Oro team CB Prat.

On August 27, 2018, Blanco came back to Asturias and signed with Círculo Gijón Baloncesto y Conocimiento of the LEB Plata. Despite not avoiding relegation with the club, he was named member of the All-season team.

Awards and accomplishments

Spanish junior national team
2001 FIBA Europe Under-16 Championship:

Personal awards
All LEB Plata team: 2018–19

Euroleague statistics

|-
| style="text-align:left;"| 2009–10
| style="text-align:left;"| Unicaja
| 9 || 2 || 14.9 || .414 || .500 || .833 || 1.3 || .6 || .4 || .0 || 4.6 || 5.0
|-
| style="text-align:left;"| 2010–11
| style="text-align:left;"| Unicaja
| 13 || 7 || 23.0 || .396 || .364 || .955 || 3.0 || .9 || .9 || .2 || 8.4 || 8.2
|-
| style="text-align:left;"| 2011–12
| style="text-align:left;"| Unicaja
| 7 || 0 || 8.5 || .444 || .250 || 1.000 || .9 || .3 || .1 || .0 || 2.9 || 2.4
|- class="sortbottom"
| style="text-align:left;"| Career
| style="text-align:left;"|
| 29 || 9 || 17.0 || .406 || .382 || .917 || 2.0 || .6 || .7 || .1 || 5.9 || 5.8

References

External links
ACB profile
Euroleague profile

1985 births
Living people
Baloncesto Fuenlabrada players
Baloncesto Málaga players
CB Canarias players
CB Prat players
Círculo Gijón players
Gijón Baloncesto players
Oviedo CB players
Liga ACB players
Real Betis Baloncesto players
Small forwards
Spanish men's basketball players
Sportspeople from Oviedo